Pseudobatenus is a genus of ground beetles in the family Carabidae. There are at least three described species in Pseudobatenus.

Species
These three species belong to the genus Pseudobatenus:
 Pseudobatenus camerunicus (Burgeon, 1942)  (Cameroon)
 Pseudobatenus longicollis Basilewsky, 1951  (Cameroon)
 Pseudobatenus straneoi Basilewsky, 1957

References

Platyninae